The End of Poverty? is a 2008 documentary film about poverty directed by Philippe Diaz. It is narrated by Martin Sheen and was produced by Cinema Libre Studio in association with the non-profit Robert Schalkenbach Foundation. The film was selected for the international critic's week award at the 2008 Cannes Festival.

Synopsis

The film begins with footage depicting the condition of severe poverty faced by many people in underdeveloped countries and contrasting it with the prosperity and wealth of developed countries. The persistent inequality between countries is established to be the main theme of the film.

The film then shifts to an historical perspective and describes the colonization of the Americas by European in 1492 as the start of this unequal relationship between the West and the rest of the world. It asserts that this colonization, which was repeated in Africa and Asia, was a means of extracting large amounts of wealth and exporting it to Europe, first through the plundering of the colonies, which involved the destruction of the local people and their communities, and then by appropriating their land and labour into the European economy. The film claims that this condition of landlessness persisted long after the colonies gained independence, forcing many to work in horrific conditions for extremely low wages.

Interviewing several scholars, the film discusses how the colonial powers were able to finance the industrialization of their own economy with the wealth that they obtained from their colonies. By employing native populations and African slaves on plantations of sugarcane, cacao, and other products, as well as in mines (such as the silver mines of Potosí in Bolivia), countries like Spain and England were able to attain their "developed" status, according to the film. It depicts these instituted economies as both severely exploiting the people who laboured on the plantations and in the mines, as well as locking these economies into producing only export goods, for which they became dependent on European markets. Colonies also became dependent on European products for their own domestic needs, as the majority of the colonial economy was geared toward exports. The colonists ensured that the exports were raw materials that were then processed into finished goods by their own industrialized economies. An imbalance was created by the destruction of indigenous technical capabilities in the colonies (such as the destruction of the Indian textile industry) and led to an increased dependency on Europe for finished consumer goods. This dependency, it is claimed, persists even today, allowing developed countries to benefit from the imbalance.

Turning to the period after World War II when most colonies gained political independence, the film states that the former colonies are nonetheless trapped within an international system of neocolonialism. International institutions like the World Bank and International Monetary Fund (IMF), it argues, forced policies that allowed Western countries and Western companies to continue to extract wealth from the former colonies. These institutions provided loans for large industrial projects in the name of "poverty reduction" and "development" that left these countries in high debt. Western countries, particularly the United States, gained huge quantities of wealth by means of the repayments of these debts, as well as through contracts for the industrial projects that the loans were designed for. Structural adjustment, another programme of the World Bank and IMF, made loans conditional on the recipient countries implementing policies of trade and capital market liberalization and privatization, allowing Western economies to benefit from unequal terms of trade and through the return on capital invested in the emerging economies. The film documents how the privatization of key sectors like health, water, and education led to increased costs and the displacement of people from their lands.

The documentary then examines the various military and covert interventions conducted by the United States, allegedly in support of the economic interests of American corporations. It discusses examples like the overthrow of Salvador Allende in Chile, the 1953 Iranian coup d'état, and the overthrow of Jacobo Árbenz in Guatemala. In each case, the film claims, the purpose was to further the interests of Western corporations: the Anglo-Iranian Oil Company in Iraq and the United Fruit Company in Guatemala.

Turning to possible solutions to global poverty, the film argues that forgiving international debt and returning the control of key natural resources to communal ownership are essential to lifting people out of poverty.

Interviewees

 John Christensen, economist
 Clifford Cobb
 William Easterly, economist
 Susan George, political scientist
 Chalmers Johnson, author, professor, and CIA consultant
 Serge Latouche, professor
 Álvaro García Linera
 John Perkins, author
 Amartya Sen, economist
 Martin Sheen, narrator
 Joseph Stiglitz, economist and professor
 Eric Toussaint
 Jaime de Amorim
 Nimrod Arackha
 David Ellerman
 Joshua Farley
 Miloon Kothari
 Michael J. Watts
 Jim Schultz
(partial list)

References

External links
 
 The End of Poverty? on YouTube.
 
 
 Filmmaker Philippe Diaz on The End of Poverty? - video report by Democracy Now!

2008 documentary films
2008 films
American documentary films
American propaganda films
Documentary films about conspiracy theories
Documentary films about poverty
2000s English-language films
2000s American films